Julius Stettenheim (born 3 December 1831 in Hamburg, Germany, died 30 October 1916 in Lichterfelde) was a German writer, author of humorous sketches, farces and musical comedies, who also wrote under the pseudonym "Wippchen".

References

External links
Jewish Encyclopedia: "Stettenheim, Julius" by Isidore Singer and Frederick Haneman (1906).

Werner Bergmann, The Jew-Eater. A Response to Wilhelm Marr, in: Key Documents of German-Jewish History, September 22, 2016. 

1831 births
1916 deaths
German satirists
Writers from Hamburg
German male non-fiction writers